Keturah Herron is an American politician from Kentucky. She is a Democrat and represents District 42 in the State House.

Herron was named as one of USA Today's Women of the Year in 2022, which recognizes women who have made a significant impact.

References 

Living people
Democratic Party members of the Kentucky House of Representatives
21st-century American politicians
Year of birth missing (living people)